Skånevikfjorden is a fjord in Norway. The fjord is fed by several smaller fjords such as the Åkrafjorden, Etnefjorden, and Matersfjorden and it flows to the southwest into the main Hardangerfjorden. Some villages along the fjord include Utåker and Skånevik. The islands of Halsnøya, Fjelbergøya, and Borgundøya lie on the northwestern side of the fjord.

One of the divers died during a break from welding metal pipes; the government had given the dive a dispensation from part of the regulations for occupational safety.

See also
 List of Norwegian fjords

References

Fjords of Vestland
Fjords of Rogaland
Etne
Kvinnherad
Vindafjord